Ibn Arabi and theoretical mysticism (Persian:ابن عربی و عرفان نظری) refers to a school of theoretical mystical thought which was developed and explored by Ibn Arabi. This thought movement also could be considered as the continuation of islamic philosophy.

Life
 
Abû ‘Abdallâh Muhammad ibn ‘Alî ibn al-‘Arabî al-Tâ’î al-Hâtimî (referred to as Ibn Arabi, and not to be confused with Abu Bakr Ibn Arabi, the Andalusian jurist) is considered one of the greatest Muslim philosophers. He was born in Murcia in Spain around year 1165. His father was a well-established person in Murcia and frequently visited Averroes where during these visits, Ibn Arabi got to meet Averroes.

Ibn Arabi's life in Andalusia was under the reign of Movahhedoun dynasty, under the flowering Islamic culture of that time. Politically, the period was marked with conflict between the Islamic Andalusia and the Christian North of the Iberian peninsula. He was educated in Eshbiliah under supervision of Ibn Safi, Ibn Qaleb and other great masters of the time. In his adolescent and youth period, there are many mystical currents in his production. He referred to nearly seventy teachers in one of his works.

Ibn Arabi and Mystical theosophy
Undoubtedly, he is counted as the founder of the great schools of mystical school of thought in the history of Islam. He had lived in the milieu which had a spiritual atmosphere full of mystical and esoteric experiences.

Historical background
Many mystical currents and movements were prevalent in Islamic Andalusia. Some such as Ibn Barrajan, Ibn Arif and Ibn Qasi give a dynamism to mysticism.  Also, the social and spiritual atmosphere of Islamic East – such as Iran, Syria and Iraq – had affected these milieu. Among these conditions are schools such as Avicennism, Suhrawardi and the Illumination school, Gnostic, etc.

Principles

Knowledge
Ibn Arabi believes in three kinds of knowledge. The first kind is rational knowledge which is the conclusion of theoretical reason. This knowledge could be true and/or false. The second kind of knowledge is delight(dhawq) which is not acquired by rational reflection. In other word it is impossible to bring them into any argument or proofs for reason. The knowledge of love, pleasure or sexual intercourse are samples for second knowledge. The third knowledge is mysterious knowledge which is beyond boundaries of reason. This knowledge is dedicated to divine prophets and his disciples. This knowledge is also called a divine knowledge by Ibn Arabi. He believes that true knowledge, namely knowledge of something in itself, just belonged to God and every definition of knowledge is useless. Knowledge has a divine nature. According to him, real Being has eternal consciousness of its reality. This real Being has the One-many nature. In other words, God is named by many names whilst it is one singular reality.

Imagination
According to William Chittick, little attention has been paid to the importance of imagination in Ibn Arabi. Before Ibn Arabi, imagination counted as one faculty among senses but Ibn Arabi tried to develop it conceptually. He interpreted imagination as follows: all beings are images of real Being and non-being. In other words, all things have two dimensions of being and non being. The universe and all other things counted as imagination which has a middle nature between sheer reality and utter nothing. All things, in fact, are considered as qualities and reflections of one thing in many ways. Iit refers to theory of the unity of existence.

See also
Illuminationism
Islamic Mysticism
Islamic philosophy
Transcendent theosophy

References

Islamic philosophical schools
Sufism in Europe